"Ain't Gonna Cry Again" is the debut solo single by English singer-songwriter Peter Cox, released in 1997 from his self-titled debut solo album. The song was written by Cox and Peter-John Vettese, and produced by Vettese. "Ain't Gonna Cry Again" reached number 37 on the UK Singles Chart and remained in the top 100 for two weeks.

Background
In a 2015 interview with Verily Victoria Vocalises, Cox chose "Ain't Gonna Cry Again" as his "favourite song lyrically" out of all the songs he has written or co-written. He noted it was "very satisfying" that people, particularly women, "seem to identify with the theme of the song". Cox added of the song's success as a single, "It was played a lot on the radio and I got some decent support but it didn't transfer into sales."

Track listing
CD single (UK and Europe)
"Ain't Gonna Cry Again" – 4:06
"In a Better World" – 4:44
"Move On Up" – 3:44

CD promotional single (UK)
"Ain't Gonna Cry Again" – 4:06

Cassette single (UK)
"Ain't Gonna Cry Again" – 4:06
"In a Better World" – 4:44
"Move On Up" – 3:44

Personnel
Production
 Peter-John Vettese – producer (all tracks)
 Chris Lord-Alge – mixing on "Ain't Gonna Cry Again"
 Mark "Tuffty" Evans – mixing on "In a Better World" and "Move On Up"

Other
 Jeremy Plumb – design
 Lorenzo Agius – photography

Charts

References

1997 songs
1997 debut singles
Chrysalis Records singles
Songs written by Peter Cox (musician)
Songs written by Peter-John Vettese
Song recordings produced by Peter-John Vettese